Pasaje is a small town in the lowlands of the El Oro Province, Ecuador. Pasaje is the seat of the Pasaje Canton. It is located on the border of the Jubones River.

External links
 mipasaje.com Website with local information in Spanish

Populated places in El Oro Province